Howland Island is an uninhabited coral island located just north of the equator in the central Pacific Ocean, about  southwest of Honolulu. The island lies almost halfway between Hawaii and Australia and is an unorganized, unincorporated territory of the United States. Together with Baker Island it forms part of the Phoenix Islands. For statistical purposes, Howland is grouped as one of the United States Minor Outlying Islands.

Howland Island National Wildlife Refuge consists of the entire island and the surrounding  of submerged land. The island is managed by the U.S. Fish and Wildlife Service as an insular area under the U.S. Department of the Interior and is part of the Pacific Remote Islands Marine National Monument.

The atoll has no economic activity. Airstrips constructed to accommodate her planned stopover were subsequently damaged, not maintained and gradually disappeared. There are no harbors or docks. The fringing reefs may pose a maritime hazard. There is a boat landing area along the middle of the sandy beach on the west coast, as well as a crumbling day beacon. The island is visited every two years by the U.S. Fish and Wildlife Service.

Flora and fauna

The climate is equatorial, with little rainfall and intense sunshine. Temperatures are moderated somewhat by a constant wind from the east. The terrain is low-lying and sandy: a coral island surrounded by a narrow fringing reef with a slightly raised central area. The highest point is about six meters above sea level.

There are no natural fresh water resources. The landscape features scattered grasses along with prostrate vines and low-growing pisonia trees and shrubs. A 1942 eyewitness description spoke of "a low grove of dead and decaying kou trees" on a very shallow hill at the island's center. In 2000, a visitor accompanying a scientific expedition reported seeing "a flat bulldozed plain of coral sand, without a single tree" and some traces of buildings from colonization or World War II building efforts, all wood and stone ruins overgrown by vegetation.

Howland is primarily a nesting, roosting and foraging habitat for seabirds, shorebirds and marine wildlife. The island, with its surrounding marine waters, has been recognized as an Important Bird Area (IBA) by BirdLife International because it supports seabird colonies of lesser frigatebirds, masked boobies, red-tailed tropicbirds and sooty terns, as well as serving as a migratory stopover for bristle-thighed curlews.

Economics 

Time zone 
Since Howland Island is uninhabited, no time zone is specified. It lies within a nautical time zone which is 12 hours behind UTC, named International Date Line West (IDLW). Howland Island and Baker Island are the only places on Earth observing this time zone. This time zone is also called AoE, Anywhere on Earth, which is a calendar designation which indicates that a period expires when the date passes everywhere on Earth.

History

Prehistoric settlement
Sparse remnants of trails and other surface features indicate a possible early Polynesian presence, including excavations and mounds along with stacked rocks and a footpath made of long flat stones. In the 1860s, James Duncan Hague noted discovering the remains of a hut, canoe fragments, a blue bead, and a human skeleton buried in the sand. However, the perishable nature of the wooden materials and the lack of bead work in Polynesia suggests these materials are historic in nature. The presence of the kou tree (Cordia subcordata) and Polynesian rats (Rattus exulans) on the island is also considered a possible indicator of early Polynesian visits to Howland.

However, the only modern archaeological survey of Howland, conducted by the US Army Corps of Engineers in 1987, found no evidence of prehistoric settlement or use of the island but sub-surface testing was limited in scope due to time constraints. Additionally, the USACE survey failed to locate the architectural features described by Hague though they concede this may be due to the destruction of these features later during the construction of an airstrip. A later conservation plan by the US Fish and Wildlife Service suggests that Howland was likely used as a stop over or meeting point as opposed to permanently occupied.

Sightings by whalers
Captain George B. Worth of the Nantucket whaler Oeno sighted Howland around 1822 and called it Worth Island. Howland Island was at last named on  after a lookout who sighted it from the whaleship Isabella under Captain Geo. E. Netcher of New Bedford.

Captain William Bligh of HMS Bounty, in his diary after the mutiny, described stopping at this Island shortly after being set adrift by the mutineers in April, 1789. He had 18 crew members who scoured the island for sustenance such as oysters, water, and birds. Bligh was unsure of the name of the island but apparently it was known to cartographers.  Bligh's account on Howland Island is open to question since his route in the boat began between Tonga and Tofua and ran more or less west directly to Timor.

U.S. possession and guano mining
Howland Island was uninhabited when the United States took possession of it under the Guano Islands Act of 1856. The island was a known navigation hazard for many decades and several ships were wrecked there. Its guano deposits were mined by American companies from about 1857 until October1878, although not without controversy.

Captain Geo. E. Netcher of the Isabella informed Captain Taylor of its discovery. As Taylor had discovered another guano island in the Indian Ocean, they agreed to share the benefits of the guano on the two islands. Taylor put Netcher in communication with Alfred G. Benson, president of the American Guano Company, which was incorporated in 1857. Other entrepreneurs were approached as George and Matthew Howland, who later became members of the United States Guano Company, engaged Mr. Stetson to visit the Island on the ship Rousseau under Captain Pope. Mr. Stetson arrived on the Island in 1854 and described it as being occupied by birds and a plague of rats.

The American Guano Company established claims in respect to Baker Island and Jarvis Island which were recognised under the U.S. Guano Islands Act of 1856. Benson tried to interest the American Guano Company in the Howland Island deposits, however the company directors considered they already had sufficient deposits. In October1857 the American Guano Company sent Benson's son Arthur to Baker and Jarvis Islands to survey the guano deposits. He also visited Howland Island and took samples of the guano. Subsequently, Alfred G. Benson resigned from the American Guano Company and together with Netcher, Taylor and George W. Benson formed the United States Guano Company to exploit the guano on Howland Island, with this claim being recognised under the U.S. Guano Islands Act of 1856.

However, when the United States Guano Company dispatched a vessel of their own in 1859 to mine the guano they found that Howland Island was already occupied by men sent there by the American Guano Company. The companies ended up in New York state court, with the American Guano Company arguing that United States Guano Company had in effect abandoned the island, since the continual possession and actual occupation required for ownership by the Guano Islands Act did not occur. The result was that both companies were allowed to mine the guano deposits, which were substantially depleted by October1878. Laborers for the mining operations came from around the Pacific, including from Hawaii; the Hawaiian laborers named Howland Island  ('kou tree grove').

In the late 19th century there were British claims on the island, as well as attempts at setting up mining. John T. Arundel and Company, a British firm using laborers from the Cook Islands and Niue, occupied the island from 1886 to 1891.

Itascatown (1935–42)

In 1935, colonists from the American Equatorial Islands Colonization Project arrived on the island to establish a permanent U.S. presence in the Central Pacific. It began with a rotating group of four alumni and students from the Kamehameha School for Boys, a private school in Honolulu. Although the recruits had signed on as part of a scientific expedition and expected to spend their three-month assignment collecting botanical and biological samples, once out to sea they were told, according to one of the Jarvis Island colonists, George West, "Your names will go down in history" and that the islands would become "famous air bases in a route that will connect Australia with California".

The settlement was named Itascatown after the USCGC Itasca that brought the colonists to Howland and made regular cruises between the other equatorial islands during that era. Itascatown was a line of a half-dozen small wood-framed structures and tents near the beach on the island's western side. The fledgling colonists were given large stocks of canned food, water, and other supplies including a gasoline-powered refrigerator, radio equipment, medical kits and (characteristic of that era) vast quantities of cigarettes. Fishing provided variety in their diet. Most of the colonists' endeavors involved making hourly weather observations and constructing rudimentary infrastructure on the island, including the clearing of a landing strip for airplanes. During this period the island was on Hawaii time, which was then 10.5hours behind UTC. Similar colonization projects were started on nearby Baker Island and Jarvis Island, as well as Canton Island and Enderbury in the Phoenix Islands, which later became part of Kiribati. According to the 1940 U.S. Census, Howland Island had a population of four people on April 1, 1940.

Kamakaiwi Field
Ground was cleared for a rudimentary aircraft landing area during the mid-1930s, in anticipation that the island might eventually become a stopover for commercial trans-Pacific air routes and also to further U.S. territorial claims in the region against rival claims from Great Britain. Howland Island was designated as a scheduled refueling stop for American pilot Amelia Earhart and navigator Fred Noonan on their round-the-world flight in 1937. Works Progress Administration (WPA) funds were used by the Bureau of Air Commerce to construct three graded, unpaved runways meant to accommodate Earhart's twin-engined Lockheed Model 10 Electra.

The facility was named Kamakaiwi Field after James Kamakaiwi, a young Hawaiian who arrived with the first group of four colonists. He was selected as the group's leader and he spent more than three years on Howland, far longer than the average recruit. It has also been referred to as WPA Howland Airport (the WPA contributed about 20 percent of the $12,000 cost). Earhart and Noonan took off from Lae, New Guinea, and their radio transmissions were picked up near the island when their aircraft reached the vicinity but they were never seen again.

Japanese attacks during World War II
The raid came one day after the Japanese attack on Pearl Harbor and damaged the three airstrips of Kamakaiwi Field. Two days later, shelling from a Japanese submarine destroyed what was left of the colony's buildings. A single bomber returned twice during the following weeks and dropped more bombs on the rubble. Thomas Bederman, one of the two survivors, later recounted his experience during the incident in a  edition of Life. Howland was occupied by a battalion of the United States Marine Corps in September1943 and was known as Howland Naval Air Station until May1944.

All attempts at habitation were abandoned after 1944. Colonization projects on the other four islands, also disrupted by the war, were also abandoned. No aircraft is known to have landed on the island, though anchorages nearby were used by float planes and flying boats during World War II.

National Wildlife Refuge

On June 27, 1974, Secretary of the Interior Rogers Morton created Howland Island National Wildlife Refuge which was expanded in 2009 to add submerged lands within  of the island. Along with six other islands, the island was administered by the U.S. Fish and Wildlife Service as part of the Pacific Remote Islands National Wildlife Refuge Complex. In January2009, that entity was upgraded to the Pacific Remote Islands Marine National Monument by President George W. Bush.

The island habitat has suffered from the presence from multiple invasive exotic species. Black rats were introduced in 1854 and eradicated in 1938 by feral cats introduced the year before. The cats proved to be destructive to bird species, and the cats were eliminated by 1985. Pacific crabgrass continues to compete with local plants.

Public entry to the island is only by special use permit from the U.S. Fish and Wildlife Service and it is generally restricted to scientists and educators. Representatives from the agency visit the island on average once every two years, often coordinating transportation with amateur radio operators or the U.S. Coast Guard to defray the high cost of logistical support.

Earhart Light

Colonists sent to the island in the mid-1930s, to establish possession by the United States, built the Earhart Light , named after Amelia Earhart, as a day beacon or navigational landmark. It is shaped like a short lighthouse. It was constructed of white sandstone with painted black bands and a black top meant to be visible several miles out to sea during daylight hours. It is located near the boat landing at the middle of the west coast, near the site of Itascatown. The beacon was partially destroyed early in World War II by Japanese attacks, but was rebuilt in the early 1960s by men from the U.S. Coast Guard ship Blackhaw. By 2000, the beacon was reported to be crumbling and it had not been repainted in decades.

Ann Pellegreno overflew the island in 1967, and Linda Finch did so in 1997, during memorial circumnavigation flights to commemorate Earhart's 1937 world flight. No landings were attempted but both Pellegreno and Finch flew low enough to drop a wreath on the island.

Image gallery

See also

List of lighthouses in United States Minor Outlying Islands
 Howland and Baker islands, includes coverage of the Howland-Baker EEZ
 History of the Pacific Islands
 List of Guano Island claims
 Phoenix Islands

References

Notes

Citations

Bibliography
 Bryan, Edwin H., Jr. American Polynesia and the Hawaiian Chain. Honolulu, Hawaii: Tongg Publishing Company, 1942.
 Butler, Susan. East to the Dawn: The Life of Amelia Earhart. Cambridge, MA: Da Capa Press, 1999. .

 "Eyewitness account of the Japanese raids on Howland Island (includes a grainy photo of Itascatown)." ksbe.edu. Retrieved: October 10, 2010.
 Irwin, Geoffrey. The Prehistroric Exploration and Colonisation of the Pacific. Cambridge, UK: Cambridge University Press, 1992. .
 Long, Elgen M. and Marie K. Long. Amelia Earhart: The Mystery Solved. New York: Simon & Schuster, 1999. .
 Maude, H.E. Of Islands and Men: Studies in Pacific History. Melbourne, Australia: Oxford University Press, 1968.
 Safford, Laurance F. with Cameron A. Warren and Robert R. Payne. Earhart's Flight into Yesterday: The Facts Without the Fiction. McLean, Virginia: Paladwr Press, 2003. .
 Sharp, Andrew. The Discovery of the Pacific Islands. Oxford: Oxford University Press, 1960.
 Suárez, Thomas. Early Mapping of the Pacific. Singapore: Periplus Editions, 2004. .

External links

Howland Island National Wildlife Refuge - U.S. Fish and Wildlife Service
Geography, history and nature on Howland Island

'Voyage of the Odyssey' – pictures and travelogue
Howland Island at Infoplease
Howland Island – Small Island, Big History 

 
Coral islands
Uninhabited Pacific islands of the United States
Amelia Earhart
Works Progress Administration
National Wildlife Refuges in the United States insular areas
Important Bird Areas of United States Minor Outlying Islands
Important Bird Areas of Oceania
Seabird colonies